Republic Day, observed on October 25, is a Public holiday in Kazakhstan, celebrating the declaration of sovereignty of the Kazakh SSR from the Soviet Union. In the waning days of Soviet rule, individual republics of the Soviet Union sought greater autonomy. The Soviet Union agreed in early 1990 to give up its monopoly of political power. Following the lead of the Lithuanian SSR, the Russian SFSR and others, the Kazakh SSR declared its sovereignty on 25 October 1990, and Kazakhstan subsequently became independent on 16 December 1991 as the Soviet Union collapsed.

References

Annual events in Kazakhstan
Kazakhstan
Winter events in Kazakhstan
Society of Kazakhstan
Public holidays in Kazakhstan